Charles Erdman(n) may refer to: 

Charles R. Erdman, Sr. (1866–1960), American minister and theologian
Charles R. Erdman Jr. (1897–1984), American politician
Charles E. Erdmann (born 1946), American jurist
Charles Christian Erdmann, Duke of Württemberg-Oels (1716–1792)

See also
Charles Erdman Petersdorff (1800–1886), British legal writer